Pentaceros wheeleri, the slender armorheard, is a species of ray-finned fish within the family Pentacerotidae. Observations based on the lack of individuals over 3 years of age in seamounts has suggested that P. wheeleri may only spawn in 1 to 2 seasons only to then die afterwards.

Synonymised names 
Placed by the World Register of Marine Species.

 Pentaceros pectoralis Hardy, 1983
 Pseudopentaceros pectoralis Hardy, 1983
 Pseudopentaceros wheeleri Hardy, 1983

References 

Fish described in 1983
wheeleri